Fossora is the tenth studio album by Icelandic singer-musician Björk. It was released on 30 September 2022 through One Little Independent Records. The album was recorded mainly during the COVID-19 pandemic and centers around the theme of isolation, loss, and grief, mainly of the death of her mother, Hildur Runa Hauksdóttir, in 2018. Commercially, the album debuted at number 11 on the UK Albums Chart and at number 100 on the US Billboard 200. It received a nomination for Best Alternative Music Album at the 65th Annual Grammy Awards, becoming Björk's ninth consecutive nomination in the category.

Background 
Fossora was partially inspired by the 2018 death of Björk's mother, Hildur Rúna Hauksdóttir; the songs "Sorrowful Soil" and "Ancestress" are about her, as well as how Björk dealt with her grief. In the album's liner notes, the former is subtitled "a eulogy for Hildur Rúna", and the latter is subtitled "an epitaph for Hildur Rúna". The album was conceptualized during the COVID-19 lockdowns after Björk travelled to Iceland to record. Keeping with the album's themes, its title is the ungrammatical feminine version of the Latin word for "digger". The album features contributions from American singer Serpentwithfeet, Björk's two children Sindri and Ísadóra, Indonesian dance duo Gabber Modus Operandi, and bass clarinet sextet Murmuri. The album was also set to feature contributions from the Venezuelan producer Arca like Björk's previous two albums Vulnicura (2015) and Utopia (2017), but due to the pandemic, Björk was unable to visit her in Barcelona or to welcome her at home.

"Allow" is an outtake from the sessions for Utopia, that was rearranged for Fossora. Per an interview with Pitchforks Jazz Monroe, Björk says the album began as "very conceptual, like: 'This is the clarinet album!' Then halfway through, I was like, 'Fuck that.'" She described it as an "'Iceland album': often uninhibited and volatile, but also steeped in the country's choral and folk traditions, with strings Björk programmed at her local coffee shop." Her interest in mushrooms "unified the record's themes of survival, death, and ecological meditation." She frames the album in contrast to her previous Utopia, with that album being "a skybound haven after her traumatic divorce" from longtime partner Matthew Barney and Fossora being her return to Earth. She describes the fungus metaphor as "something that lives underground, but not tree roots. A tree root album would be quite severe and stoic, but mushrooms are psychedelic and they pop up everywhere."

Promotional campaign and release 
The lead single, "Atopos", along with its cover art, was announced on 24 August. The release date was later confirmed for 6 September, with the song premiering on BBC Radio 6 Music. The second single, "Ovule", was released without any prior announcement on 14 September, along with a music video directed by Nick Knight, who had also worked on Björk's own "Pagan Poetry" music video in 2001. The third single, "Ancestress", featuring Björk's son, Sindri Eldon, was released on 22 September. The title track was released as the fourth single on 27 September 2022 but with no music video. The music video for "Sorrowful Soil" premiered on 2 December.

Fossora was released as a digisleeve CD, deluxe hardbound book CD, limited cassette, and double LP; a turquoise variant of the LP exclusive to her official website and record label; a green variant of the LP being exclusive to indie record stores; standard black and 4 other color variants (burgundy, lime, silver, and clear) were also available from other specific retailers.

Critical reception

Fossora was met with acclaim from critics upon its release. At Metacritic, which assigns a normalised rating out of 100 to reviews from mainstream publications, the album received an average score of 85, based on 22 reviews. Aggregator AnyDecentMusic? gave it 7.9 out of 10, based on their assessment of the critical consensus.

Concluding the review for AllMusic, Heather Phares declared that "On this soul-nourishing tour de force, her one-of-a-kind mix of innovation and emotion is as inspiring as it's ever been over her decades-long career." At Clash, David Weaver claimed that, "there is no doubt that with Fossora, Björk is restating her individuality, thematically examining her place in the world as a 56-year old musician, whilst assuredly pushing sonic boundaries from neo-classical to industrial noise." Paul Bridgewater shared similar sentiments in the review for The Line of Best Fit; "Fossora does indeed bang harder than any of her albums have for a long time and yet it’s not an abrasive record at heart."

In a review of the album for NME, Emily MacKay declared it "An album of reinfatuation and reaffirmation, Fossora is invigorating in its drive, if there’s little of real surprise here; hard as the mushroom-gabber beats are, if you've heard 'Pluto' or 'Mutual Core', you won't be shocked." Pitchfork reviewer Jill Mapes described Björk's performance as being "grounded back on earth, searching for hope in death, mushrooms, and matriarchy, and finding it in bass clarinet and gabber beats." Will Hermes at Rolling Stone stated that "Fossora zooms in Google Map-style, looking at people on the ground and in the room, measuring distances between them. The sonic landscape is still huge — awesome, as alien as it is familiar, full of otherworldly arrangements, tectonic beats, and craggy melodies that conjure the terrain of her native Iceland. The artist described it as something of her 'mushroom' album, using metaphors about burrowing in the dirt. In short, it’s Björk at her absolute Björkiest."

Amongst the few reviewers that were more critical of the album, Slant Magazine writer Sam C. Mac wrote that, "The Icelandic iconoclast's compositional sense is as unbound as ever, her songs amoeba-like organisms transfiguring from one second to the next across the album, in line with a logic that’s defiantly hers alone, both for better and worse." Austin Saalman compared the album less favorably to Björk's oeuvre, in the review for Under the Radar; "Fossora is less engaging than Utopia, Vulnicura, and Biophilia, and except for 'Ovule', 'Ancestress', and 'Allow', cannot compete with her 1990s and early 2000s output." At Paste, Max Feedman called it "a dense, challenging experiment that gradually coheres into an immersive and sometimes unsettling experience," but also noted that it wasn't without its, "occasional missteps along the way."

The album's third single, "Ancestress", was named the 18th best song of 2022 by Pitchfork.

Year-end lists

Track listing
All tracks produced by Björk, except for "Ovule" additionally produced by el Guincho.

Note: Original pressings of the album credit Gapper Modus Operandi as a whole rather than Kasimyn. Streaming versions, alongside the 2023 repress of the album instead solely credit Kasimyn.

Personnel

"Atopos"

Björk – vocals, clarinet arrangement, beat, beat editing, production
Gabber Modus Operandi – beat
Baldvin Ingvar Tryggvason – clarinet
Grimur Helgason – clarinet
Helga Björg Arnardóttir – clarinet
Hilma Kristín Sveinsdóttir – clarinet
Kristín Þóra Pétursdóttir – clarinet
Rúnar Óskarsson – clarinet
Matthías Birgír Nardeau – oboe

"Ovule"

Bjōrk – vocals, trombone and timpani arrangements, beat, production
El Guincho – additional beat production
Sideproject – additional beat production
Soraya Nayyar – percussion
Bergur Þórisson – trombone

"Mycelia"

Björk – vocals, programming, editing, production

"Sorrowful Soil"

Björk – vocals, choir arrangement, bassline, production
Hamrahlíðarkórinn – vocals
Þorgerður Ingólsfdóttir – conducting

"Ancestress"

Björk – vocals, vocal arrangement, string and percussion arrangements, beat, programming, production
Sindri Eldon – vocals, vocal arrangement
Una Sveinbjarnardóttir – violin
Helga Þóra Björgvinsdóttir – violin
Laura Liu – violin
Ingrid Karlsdóttir – violin
Geirþrúður Ása Guðjónsdóttir – violin
Þórunn Ósk Marinósdóttir – viola
Lucja Koczot – viola
Sigurður Bjarki Gunnarsson – cello
Júlia Mogenson – cello
Xun Yang – contrabass
Soraya Nayyar – percussion
Ragenheiður Ingunn Jóhannsdóttir – conducting

"Fagurt Er í Fjörðum"

Björk – vocals, production
Ferdinand Rauter – bassline MIDI

"Victimhood"

Björk – vocals, clarinet arrangement, beat, production
Baldvin Ingvar Tryggvason – clarinet
Grimur Helgason – clarinet
Helga Björg Arnardóttir – clarinet
Hilma Kristín Sveinsdóttir – clarinet
Kristín Þóra Pétursdóttir – clarinet
Rúnar Óskarsson – clarinet
Matthías Birgír Nardeau – oboe

"Allow"

Björk – vocals, flute arrangement, beat, production
Emilie Nicolas – vocals
Eivind Helgerød – additional vocal production
Áshildur Haraldsdóttir – flute
Berglind María Tómasdóttir – flute
Björg Brjánsdóttir – flute
Dagný Marinósdóttir – flute
Emilía Rós Sigfúsdóttir – flute
Hafdis Vigfúsdóttir – flute
Melkorka Ólafsdóttir – flute
Pamela De Sensi – flute
Sigríður Hjördís Indriðadóttir – flute
Sólveig Magnúsdóttir – flute
Steinunn Vala Pálsdóttir – flute
Þuríður Jónsdóttir – flute

"Fungal City"

Björk – vocals, vocal arrangement, clarinet and string arrangements, beat, beat editing, production
Serpentwithfeet – vocal arrangement
Gabber Modus Operandi – beat
Baldvin Ingvar Tryggvason – clarinet
Grimur Helgason – clarinet
Helga Björg Arnardóttir – clarinet
Hilma Kristín Sveinsdóttir – clarinet
Kristín Þóra Pétursdóttir – clarinet
Rúnar Óskarsson – clarinet
Una Sveinbjarnardóttir – violin
Helga Þóra Björgvinsdóttir – violin
Laura Liu – violin
Ingrid Karlsdóttir – violin
Geirþrúður Ása Guðjónsdóttir – violin
Þórunn Ósk Marinósdóttir – viola
Lucja Koczot – viola
Sigurður Bjarki Gunnarsson – cello
Júlia Mogenson – cello
Xun Yang – contrabass
Ragenheiður Ingunn Jóhannsdóttir – conducting
Matthías Birgír Nardeau – oboe

"Trölla-Gabba"

Björk – vocals, programming, editing, production
Gabber Modus Operandi – beat, backing vocals (physical versions) 

"Freefall"

Björk – vocals, string arrangement, production
Una Sveínbjarnardóttir – violin
Helga Þóra Björgvinsdóttir – violin
Þórunn Ósk Marinósdóttir – viola
Sigurður Bjarki Gunnarsson – cello
Xun Yang – contrabass

"Fossora"

Björk – vocals, clarinet and oboe arrangements, editing, production
Gabber Modus Operandi – beat, backing vocals (physical versions)
Baldvin Ingvar Tryggvason – clarinet
Grimur Helgason – clarinet
Helga Björg Arnardóttir – clarinet
Hilma Kristín Sveinsdóttir – clarinet
Kristín Þóra Pétursdóttir – clarinet
Rúnar Óskarsson – clarinet
Matthías Birgír Nardeau – oboe

"Her Mother's House"

Björk – vocals, cor anglais arrangement, keyboard progamming, production
Ìsadóra Bjarkardóttir Barney – vocals
Matthías Birgír Nardeau – cor anglais

Charts

Notes

References

External links
 Official website

2022 albums
Albums produced by Björk
Björk albums
One Little Independent Records albums